New Shepard is a vertical-takeoff, vertical-landing (VTVL), crew-rated suborbital launch vehicle developed by Blue Origin as a commercial system for suborbital space tourism. Blue Origin is owned and led by Amazon founder and former CEO Jeff Bezos.

The name New Shepard makes reference to the first American astronaut in space, Alan Shepard, one of the original NASA Mercury Seven astronauts, who ascended to space in 1961 on a suborbital trajectory similar to that of New Shepard.

Prototype engine and vehicle flights began in 2006, while full-scale engine development started in the early 2010s and was complete by 2015. Uncrewed flight testing of the complete New Shepard vehicle (propulsion module and space capsule) began in 2015.

On 23 November 2015, after reaching  altitude (outer space), the suborbital New Shepard booster successfully performed a powered vertical soft landing, the first time a suborbital booster rocket had returned from space to make a successful vertical landing. The test program continued in 2016 and 2017 with four additional test flights made with the same vehicle (NS-2) in 2016 and the first test flight of the new NS-3 vehicle made in 2017.

Blue Origin planned its first crewed test flight to occur in 2018, which was however delayed until 2021, and has since announced that tickets would begin to be sold for commercial flights of up to six people. The first crewed flight took place on 20 July 2021. An anonymous buyer (later revealed to have been Justin Sun) purchased one seat for the 20 July 2021 flight at auction for $28 million but this person did not fly on said flight due to scheduling problems; the anonymous buyer was rescheduled for a later flight. Instead of the auction winning passenger, 18-year-old Oliver Daemen was selected to fly. Daemen's father paid for his flight, thus Daemen was the first customer (i.e., person whose flight has been paid for) passenger of New Shepard and became the youngest person and first teenager to fly into space.

As of 4 August 2022, New Shepard has flown 32 passengers into space (31 first time spaceflight participants).

On 12 September 2022, the RSS H. G. Wells capsule aborted during the NS-23 mission mid-flight due to a propulsion failure.

Launch statistics

Rocket confingurations

Launch outcome

Crewed missions

Crew launched

Past launches

See also 
 New Glenn
 
 SpaceX reusable launch system development program
 List of crewed spacecraft
 List of Virgin Galactic launches

References 

Crewed spacecraft
Reusable spacecraft
Alan Shepard
Blue Origin launch vehicles
Space tourism
VTVL rockets
Lists of rocket launches